Sharks Charleroi, previously Dauphines Charleroi (until 2017), is a Belgian women's volleyball club from Charleroi. 

The women's A .

Previous names
The club have competed under the following names:
 Dauphines Charleroi (?–2017)
 Sharks Charleroi (2017–present)

Honours

National competitions
  Belgian Championship: 2
2005–06, 2008–09

  Belgian Cup: 2
1994–95, 2011–12

Team squad
Season 2016–2017, as of January 2017.

References

External links
Official site 

 

Belgian volleyball clubs
Sport in Charleroi